Donald Insall Associates is a firm of architects, designers and historic building consultants.

They have worked on contemporary and historic listed  buildings, monuments and sites throughout Britain, and at UNESCO World Heritage Sites including The Palace of Westminster, Cross Bath, the Tower of London, Kew Gardens and Caernarfon Castle. They were involved in the restoration of Windsor Castle following the 1992 fire. They have worked extensively in the adaptive re-use of historic buildings, contemporary interventions and new design. (Examples include the Copper Kingdom Visitor Centre at Amlwch, Anglesey.)

Sir Donald Insall founded the company during 1958 and was chairman until 1998. He continues to act as a consultant. They continue to operate according to the methodology and philosophy established by Insall, as outlined in his 2008 book, Living Buildings.

They have won over 200 awards
for their work, including twice-winning the Europa Nostra UK Medal of Honour, (and recently the RIBA Building of the Year, Wales, for the Amlwch Copper Kingdom project.

Donald Insall Associates are now majority employee-owned and work from seven UK locations, as well as working internationally as both architects and consultants. Their principal office is at 12 Devonshire Street, London. They currently have branches in Bath, Birmingham, Cambridge, Chester, Manchester, Oxford and Conwy. 
In 2015 they were ranked number 39 in the Architects' Journal AJ120 list of largest practices in the UK.

Major projects
Major projects include:

Public and Institutional

 The Palace of Westminster, London
 Westminster Hall 
 House of Lords Chamber
 Cloister Court and the Pugin-designed Courtyards
 The Encaustic tile floors
 Sovereign's Robing Room
 The Pugin Room
 The Tower of London, London
 Hampton Court Palace, London 
 Goldsmiths' Hall, London 
 The Banqueting House, Whitehall:  
 Cross Bath Spa, Bath:  
 Lincoln's Inn Great Hall: 
 Mansion House, London
 Liverpool Town Hall: 
 Lord's Cricket Ground, London
 Cardiff Castle, South Wales
 Caernarfon Castle, Gwynedd, North Wales
 Hotel Café Royal, Regent Street, London
 The former Regent Palace Hotel, Regent Street, London
Kew Palace, London

Arts: Museums, Galleries and Libraries

 Somerset House, London
The major refurbishment of the South Building, incorporating a new gallery and restored Seamen's Hall. Repaving and fountains to the courtyard.
 Staircase House, Stockport
 Battle Abbey Gatehouse, Kent
 The Kew Pagoda, Temperate House and the Marianne North Gallery, Kew Gardens, London
 Kew Palace, Kew, London
 Bluecoat School, Liverpool

Religious Buildings and Sites

 Chester Cathedral, Cheshire 
  Tony Barton (chairman) is the Cathedral Architect
 Bangor Cathedral, Bangor, North Wales
 Simon Malam is Cathedral Architect
 Pembroke College Chapel, Cambridge University, Cambridge

Educational

The Wren Library, Trinity College, Cambridge:
 The Stephen Hawking Building, Gonville and Caius College, Cambridge 
 Woldingham School
They prepared a masterplan and designed and built a new Performing Arts Centre. 
 Codrington Library, New College, Oxford
 Cockerell Building, Cambridge:
 Bangor University Arts Building, North Wales

Research and Education

Publications

Donald Insall Associates' members publish regularly. Major publications by the firm include: 
 The Care of Old Buildings Today 
 Living Buildings – Architectural Conservation: Philosophy, Principles and Practice.
 Chester: A Study in Conservation

Academic Activities

Donald Insall Associates lecture at specialist conferences in Europe, the Americas and Far East. They have lectured regularly  at
 Royal College of Arts
 International Centre for Conservation, Rome University
 Catholic University of Leuven, Belgium
 College d'Europe in Bruges.   
 Canterbury University

References

Architecture firms of the United Kingdom
Conservation architects
Design companies established in 1958
1958 establishments in the United Kingdom